Lyces solaris is a moth of the family Notodontidae first described by William Schaus in 1892. It is known from Peru, Bolivia and Argentina.

References

Notodontidae